EcoZoom is a certified B Corporation that makes charcoal, wood and biomass cook stoves. The company has offices in Portland, Oregon and Nairobi, Kenya. EcoZoom holds the exclusive license to distribute stove technology designed by Aprovecho in developing countries and a second license to distribute in the United States.

History 
EcoZoom was started in April 2011 by Ben West to increase the distribution of improved cookstoves in developing nations.

Timeline 
2011
January – EcoZoom receives B Corporation status
2012
January – EcoZoom joins the Portland State University Social Innovation Incubator Vector Program
February – EcoZoom completes a 10,000 stove pilot program with the Mexican government to replace open-fire cooking and indoor cooking stoves with a double burner stove called La Mera Mera
November – EcoZoom is named by Sustainable Business Oregon as a Sustainable Business Award Finalist
2013
May – EcoZoom opens up second office in Nairobi, Kenya
September – EcoZoom Case Study is used by the Global Alliance for Clean Cookstoves to demonstrate product design process to increase adoption of stoves

Product design 
EcoZoom stoves use a rocket stove design for efficient combustion of fuel. As a result, less fuel is used compared to an open fire with less smoke emitted, helping cooks from inhaling harmful smoke while using less natural resources.

Business model 
EcoZoom sells stoves direct-to-consumer in the US while completing multiple international projects in Haiti, Kenya, Mexico, Rwanda, Somalia, and South Africa.

See also 
 Cook Stove
 List of stoves
 Portable stoves
 Rocket stove
 Wood-burning stoves
 Aprovecho

References 

Stoves
Companies based in Portland, Oregon
Benefit corporations